Spišskí Rytieri SNV (in English: Spišskí Knights SNV) is a Slovak professional basketball club based in Spišská Nová Ves. Founded in 2004, the team currently plays in the Slovak Basketball League, the highest tier of basketball in Slovakia. The team has won one national championship, in 2021.

The club was previously named BK Spišská Nová Ves, but in August 2020 its name was changed to Spišskí Rytieri. In the first season under the new name, Rytieri immediately won its first Slovak Basketball League championship ever. The same season, the Slovak Cup was won as well, thus the team won the double.

Honors and titles
Total titles: 3

Domestic
Slovak Basketball League
Champions (1): 2020–21
Slovak Cups
Winners (2): 2006, 2021

References

External links
Official website

Basketball teams in Slovakia
Basketball teams established in 2004
2004 establishments in Slovakia
Spišská Nová Ves
Sport in Košice Region